Rick Sings Nelson is a 1970 country rock album by Ricky Nelson and the Stone Canyon Band.

It was the first album on which Nelson wrote every song.

Critical reception
The Encyclopedia of Popular Music called the album "accomplished", writing that it was part of "a series of strong, often underrated, albums".

Track listing
All tracks composed by Ricky Nelson.
 "We've Got Such a Long Way to Go" – 3:57
 "California" – 3:04
 "Anytime" – 4:28
 "Down Along the Bayou Country" – 2:10
 "Sweet Mary" – 3:25
 "Look at Mary" – 3:08
 "The Reason Why" – 4:19
 "Mr. Dolphin" – 3:40
 "How Long" – 3:00
 "My Woman" – 3:58

Personnel

Musicians
 Rick Nelson – guitar, piano, lead vocals
 Allen Kemp – lead guitar, backing vocals
 Tim Cetera – bass guitar, backing vocals
 Tom Brumley – steel guitar
 Patrick Shanahan – drums

Production
 Producer: Rick Nelson
 Executive producer: John Walsh

Charts

References

Ricky Nelson albums
1970 albums
Decca Records albums
MCA Records albums